Graham Harcourt (16 April 1934 – 6 May 2015) was a British gymnast. He competed in eight events at the 1952 Summer Olympics, which he considered as his greatest success.

Biography
In his early years, Harcourt was playing rugby but because of his father's advice to focus on one discipline, he chose gymnastics and joined Swansea YMCA Gymnastic Club. During his early career as a teenage gymnast, he was successful in local competitions and won Junior Welsh Championships when he was 14. He continued his training under Walter Walsh and Arthur Whitford. Harcourt's major breakthrough achievement was placing at the 4th place in British Championships in 1952 at the age of 17 - it secured him a place in the British Olympic team at the 1952 Summer Olympics. After Olympics, he had to do compulsory National Service and did not train about for two years. This, connected with progressing arthritis which started in his spine, resulted in him not qualifying for 1956 Summer Olympics. After retiring from the gymnastics he helped to develop family printing business in Swansea and coached British Olympian Andrew Morris.

Footnotes

References

1934 births
2015 deaths
British male artistic gymnasts
Olympic gymnasts of Great Britain
Gymnasts at the 1952 Summer Olympics
Sportspeople from Swansea
20th-century British people